Serbian Archbishopric or Archbishopric of Serbia may refer to:

 Archbishopric of Žiča and Peć (1219–1346), name of the medieval Serbian Orthodox Church as an autocephalous archbishopric
 Metropolitanate of Karlovci of Krušedol (1708–1848), autonomous Serbian Orthodox archbishopric, in the territory of the Habsburgh monarchy, turned into a patriarchate in 1848
 Metropolitanate of Belgrade (1831–1920), autonomous Serbian Orthodox archbishopric, in the territory of Principality, then Kingdom of Serbia, merged into the unified Serbian Orthodox Church 1920
 Orthodox Ohrid Archbishopric (est. 2002), autonomous jurisdiction of the Serbian Orthodox Church, in the territory of North Macedonia.

See also
 Serbian Patriarchate (disambiguation)
 Archbishopric of Ohrid (disambiguation)